Lirularia yamadana is a species of small sea snail, a marine gastropod mollusk in the family Trochidae, the top snails.

Description
The height of the shell attains 6 mm, its diameter 4½ mm. The ovate-conical, slightly perforate shell is dull whitish. It is painted on the lirae with lilac-brown tessellations, somewhat formed into flammules. The five whorls are convex, and separated by profound sutures, ridged by delicate spiral lirae articulated with lilac-brown (5 to 6 on penultimate, about 20 on the body whorl). The shell shows oblique incremental lines. The pearly aperture is circular,  equalling ½ the total length. The columella is a trifle thickened. The terminations of the peristome are joined by a thin callus.

The elongate brownish-lilac spots on the lirations are situated somewhat irregularly underneath each other, so as to form flammulations.

Distribution
This marine species occurs off Japan.

References

 Higo, S., Callomon, P. & Goto, Y. (1999) Catalogue and Bibliography of the Marine Shell-Bearing Mollusca of Japan. Elle Scientific Publications, Yao, Japan, 749 pp.

yamadana
Gastropods described in 1875